Richard Krejčí (born 22 July 1970) is a Czech rower. He competed in the men's coxed four event at the 1992 Summer Olympics.

References

External links
 

1970 births
Living people
Czech male rowers
Olympic rowers of Czechoslovakia
Rowers at the 1992 Summer Olympics
People from Mělník
Sportspeople from the Central Bohemian Region